Mate Mezulić (born July 15, 1981 in Pula) is a Croatian bobsledder who has competed since 2008. At the 2010 Winter Olympics, he was part of the Croatian team that finished 20th in the four-man event though he was replaced after the second run.

Mezulić's best finish was sixth in a minor league version of the World Cup in the four-man event twice in December 2009.

References
 
 

1981 births
Bobsledders at the 2010 Winter Olympics
Bobsledders at the 2014 Winter Olympics
Living people
Olympic bobsledders of Croatia